Ioannis (Vardan) Agatzanian (born 21 March 1971) is a retired Armenian-born Greek Greco-Roman wrestler. He became a European Champion in 1995 and competed at the 1996 Olympics.

Biography
Vardan Agatzanian was born on 21 March 1971 in Yerevan, Armenia. He started practicing Greco-Roman wrestling at the age of 10 years under the leadership of Robert Asriyan, and in the future he was also taught by Robert Nersesyan. In 1988, he was the world champion among juniors (under 18).

He moved to Greece in 1993 and later played for the country under the name of Ioannis Agatzanian. Agatzanian won three medals at the European Wrestling Championships, winning bronze in 1994, gold in 1995, and silver in 1996. He participated at the 1996 Summer Olympics in Atlanta, where he came in 8th place at 48 kg.

In 1997, after a decision was made to reduce the number of weight categories and resulted in the elimination of flyweight category, Agatzanian, as well as many flyweight wrestlers, was forced to finish his career. After retiring from the sport, he engaged in business activity in Greece and Armenia.

References

External links
 Ioannis Agatzanian at The-Sports.org
 

1971 births
Living people
Sportspeople from Yerevan
Soviet male sport wrestlers
Armenian wrestlers
Greek male sport wrestlers
Wrestlers at the 1996 Summer Olympics
Olympic wrestlers of Greece
Greek people of Armenian descent
European Wrestling Champions